The following list consists of Dinaric karst highland plateaus in Bosnia and Herzegovina:

List of karst plateaus
 Romanija plateau
 Luburić plateau, Romanija
 Glasinac plateau, Romanija
 Grabež plateau, Bihać
 Grabovica plateau
 Nišići plateau & Bijambare
 Borci plateau, Konjic, Glavatičevo
 Vučevo plateau (Maglić)
 Zagorje plateau, Kalinovik (Lelija)
 Crna Gora plateau, Nevesinje, Glavatičevo (Prenj)
 Morine plateau, Ulog (Crvanj)
 Blace plateau, Blace (Bjelašnica)
 Blidinje plateau

References

External links
 Journal of Caves and Karst Studies